Mikael Modrekili was a Georgian calligrapher, poet, writer and scholar of the 10th century.

Mikael was born in Georgian aristocratic family. He in his works names his uncle David.

Mikael worked in Shatberdi monastery of Georgian kingdom of Tao-Klarjeti.

The Iadgari of Mikael Modrekili was designed by him and two anonymous copyists.

His calligraphy and text was written in classical Nuskhuri script of Georgian alphabet  without ligatures, in black and red ink where in the text above and beneath the lines were written in red ink and the old musical notes. He designed his works with colored initials and ornamental headpieces.

His calligraphy was rich of decor and ornaments. His works had the miniature images of Stephen of Tbeti and Basil of Caesarea.

As for his calligraphical work his paintings were of an excellent quality. He is considered as one of the most brilliant masters of the Georgian calligraphy.

Mikael in his works names the Georgian royal Bagrationi dynasty monarchs: David III of Tao, Bagrat II of Iberia and Gurgen of Georgia.

He is also an author of hymnographies:
დასდებელნი ნათლისღებისა და წმიდისა მოწამისა ჰაბოჲსნივე (Epiphany of Saint Aboy)
დღესასწაულობაჲ ნათლისღებისათჳს უფლისა ჩუენისა იესუ ქრისტჱსა და ჴსენებაჲ ღუაწლით შემოსილისა უძლეველისა მოწამისა ჰაბო ისმაიტელ ყოფილისა ქართველისაჲ (Celebration of Epiphany of our Lord Jesus Christ and remembering the Saint Aboy the Georgian)
იამბიკონი (Iambikoni i.e. Iambus)

References

Calligraphers from Georgia (country)
10th-century people from Georgia (country)